Alexandru Cimbriciuc (born 18 June 1968) is a politician, jurist and businessman from the Republic of Moldova.

Political activity
Between 2009 and 2014, Alexandru Cimbriciuc was deputy to the Parliament of the Republic of Moldova in the parliamentary faction of the Liberal Democratic Party of Moldova, member of the parliamentary commission for national security, defense and public order, chairman of the subcommittee on public order. In March 2015, Cimbriciuc was appointed Deputy Minister of Defense, and in May 2016 he resigned after a scandal that his son had generated and the appearance of information in the press as if intimidating a journalist. At the same time, he retired as a member of the Liberal Democratic Party of Moldova. 

Alexandru Cimbriciuc is a former Ministry of Internal Affairs collaborator (1990-1993), and from 1995 to 2009 he was director of the private security organization "Chuan-Pu" LTD.

Publications
 "Chuan-Pu - Martial fight"
 "Heroes in Soroca in the battle of the Dniester"
 "The Universe of Traditions"

References

External links 
 Site-ul Parlamentului Republicii Moldova 
 Partidul Liberal Democrat din Moldova

1968 births
Living people
Liberal Democratic Party of Moldova MPs
Moldovan MPs 2009–2010